Vilkhivka is a village in the Kalush Raion, Ivano-Frankivsk Oblast (province) of northern Ukraine.

Demographics
Native language as of the Ukrainian Census of 2001:
 Ukrainian 99.53%
 Others 0.47%

References

Villages in Kalush Raion